The 2010 Norwegian Football Cup Final was the final match of the 2010 Norwegian Football Cup, the 105th season of the Norwegian Football Cup, the premier Norwegian football cup competition organized by the Football Association of Norway (NFF). The match was played on 14 November 2010 at the Ullevaal Stadion in Oslo, and was contested between the First Division side Follo and the Tippeligaen side Strømsgodset. Strømsgodset defeated Follo 2–0 to claim the Norwegian Cup for a fifth time in their history.

Route to the final 

(TL) = Tippeligaen team
(D1) = 1. divisjon team
(D2) = 2. divisjon team
(D3) = 3. divisjon team

Match

Details

References

2010
Strømsgodset Toppfotball matches
Football Cup
Norwegian Football Cup Final
Sports competitions in Oslo
2010s in Oslo
Final